American Humane (AH) is an organization founded in 1877 committed to ensuring the safety, welfare, and well-being of animals. It was previously called the International Humane Association before changing its name in 1878. In 1940, it became the sole monitoring body for the humane treatment of animals on the sets of Hollywood films and other broadcast productions. American Humane is best known for its certification mark "No Animals Were Harmed", which appears at the end of film or television credits where animals are featured. It has also run the Red Star Animal Emergency Services since 1916. In 2000, American Humane formed the Farm Animal Services program, an animal welfare label system for food products. American Humane is currently headquartered in Washington, D.C. It is a section 501(c)(3) nonprofit organization.

Early history

American Humane began on October 9, 1877, as the International Humane Association, with the amalgamation of 27 organizations from across the United States after a meeting at the Kennard House in Cleveland, Ohio. The invitation to the other groups came from the Illinois Humane Society, sent on September 15, 1877, to discuss the specific problem of farm animal maltreatment during their transport between the eastern and western US. Groups attending the meeting included associations from the State of New York, Illinois, Ohio, Pennsylvania, Michigan, Maryland, Connecticut, and New Hampshire. A group from Minnesota also pledged its support to the forthcoming results of the conference, though they could not attend, and a group from the Canadian province of Quebec requested that a transcript of the proceedings be sent to them afterward.

The International Humane Association changed its name to the "American Humane Association" in November 1878. New member organizations were in attendance for their second annual general meeting, held in Baltimore, Maryland, and also came from California, Massachusetts, Maine, Delaware, and the District of Columbia. Canadian regions were also included in the Association. From 1892 to 1900, Francis H. Rowley was Secretary of the American Humane Association.

In 1916, American Humane founded Red Star Rescue Relief after the U.S. Secretary of War asked American Humane to rescue injured horses on the battlefields of World War I. Notable members of 1917 included President William O. Stillman and 2nd Vice-President Peter G. Gerry. There were 36 Vice-Presidents listed including William Howard Taft, Thomas R. Marshall, and Francis H. Rowley.

In 1954, tensions within the ranks of American Humane members came to a head at the organization's annual meeting, as a member-nominated slate of board candidates stood for office in opposition to a board-nominated slate. The majority of those assembled at the Atlanta, Georgia, convention elected the three candidates on the member-nominated slate; J. Perry, Raymond Naramore, and Roland Smith. In the meeting's aftermath, there were firings and resignations on the part of staff members, including Larry Andrews, Marcia Glaser, Helen Jones, and Fred Myers. This core group went on to found a new organization, the National Humane Society, later known as The Humane Society of the United States, as an alternative to American Humane.

American Humane's first "No Animals Were Harmed" end credit was issued at the end of the movie The Doberman Gang in 1972.

In 1997, American Humane launched The Front Porch Project to prevent child abuse and neglect.

Charity evaluations
American Humane is a BBB accredited charity. American Humane also received a B+ rating from CharityWatch.

Red Star Animal Emergency Services
According to The Gettysburg Times, the "American Humane Association began offering animal relief in August 1916, by accepting an invitation of the War Department to help animals used by the U.S. Army during WWI. The invitation resulted in the development of the American Red Star Animal Relief Program known today as Red Star Rescue Relief. Since its inception, the American Humane Association's Red Star Animal Emergency Services has responded to national and international disasters, rescuing thousands of animals." Disasters in which the group has rescued animals including the 2011 Joplin tornado, Hurricane Katrina, the 2010 Haiti earthquake, Hurricane Sandy, the 2011 Tōhoku earthquake and tsunami, and the September 11 attacks.

Today, Red Star Rescue Relief includes a fleet of emergency response vehicles customized to help animals in disasters, as well as specialized rescue equipment designed specifically for animal search and rescue.

Recently, Red Star Rescue Relief saved hundreds of shelter animals following an F-5 tornado in Oklahoma. In addition to natural disasters, Red Star Rescue Relief also recovers animals from dog-fighting rings, man-made disasters, and hazardous animal shelters.

Publications
American Humane has released several books and publications including:
 Animal Stars: Behind the Scenes with Your Favorite Animal Actors (2014) chronicles the animals and trainers in popular movies and television shows.
 Pet Meets Baby (2011) which provides tips to animal owners on how to prepare for a baby.
 Protecting Children, a quarterly journal focused on child welfare.

Work in the film industry

Film and television unit
American Humane began its work in film in 1940 after an incident that occurred on the set of the film Jesse James. The group began protesting the public release of the film because of a scene in which a horse was forced to run off the edge of a cliff. The horse fell over 70 feet to the ground below and broke its spine, having to be put down afterwards. In 1966, American Humane's access to some sets was diminished for 14 years following the dismantling of the Hays Office, during which time their jurisdiction was lessened.

By contract with the Screen Actors Guild, American Humane monitors animal use on film sets. However, the Screen Actors Guild has no jurisdiction concerning non-American and non-union productions.

In 1980, following the release of Heaven's Gate, the opening of which was met with a national picketing and protest effort after complaints about how the filming of the movie had involved the inhumane treatment of animals – including the deaths of five horses – the Screen Actors Guild negotiated for the universal presence of American Humane on the set as part of its union deal, forcing moviemakers to contact American Humane in advance of any animal being present on set.

Today the American Humane Film and Television Unit specifically oversees animals used during media productions, and it is sanctioned by the Screen Actors Guild to oversee a production's humane care of animals. It is the only organization with jurisdiction to do so within the United States. Because of this, American Humane may choose to issue the end credit disclaimer "No Animals Were Harmed", with a piece of a filmstrip that depicts a dog, a horse and an elephant. American Humane also reports on animal safety during filming if public concerns arise or if animal accidents happen on the set. American Humane protects the animals on the set as well as the cast/crew members who interact with the animals. According to American Humane, they ensure that budgets and time constraints do not compromise the safety or care of the animals.

Guidelines
American Humane's standard of animal care is outlined in the Guidelines for the Safe Use of Animals in Filmed Media, which were established in 1988. It covers large animals, as well as fish, insects, birds, reptiles, and any other living creature. On the set, American Humane's Certified Animal Safety Representatives attempt to ensure the Guidelines are upheld. American Humane's oversight includes film, television, commercials, music videos, and Internet productions.

Criticism
In the late 1980s, American Humane was accused by Bob Barker and the United Activists for Animal Rights of condoning animal cruelty on the set of Project X and in several other media projects. The basis of the accusation was the allowing of a cattle prod and a gun on set, and the rumored beating of the chimpanzee on set. American Humane responded by launching a $10 million suit for libel, slander and invasion of privacy against Barker. American Humane claimed that there had been a two-year "vendetta" against them behind the accusations. In a series of public advertisements along with the $10 million libel suit, American Humane stated that the allegations were made based on insufficient and misleading information. The suit was eventually settled by Barker's insurance company, which paid American Humane $300,000.

Los Angeles Times reported, in 2001, that the American Humane Film Unit "has been slow to criticize cases of animal mistreatment, yet quick to defend the big-budget studios it is supposed to police," and that an examination of American Humane "also raises questions about the association's effectiveness." The article cites numerous cases of animals injured during filming which the American Humane may have overlooked.

In late 2013, The Hollywood Reporter ran a story which implicated American Humane in turning a blind eye to and underreporting incidents of animal abuse on television and movie sets. For example, during the filming of The Hobbit: An Unexpected Journey, 27 animals died. Nevertheless, the movie received a "no animals were harmed" disclaimer. During the filming of the movie Life of Pi, the tiger "King" nearly drowned in a pool, yet this incident was not reported outside of the American Humane organization.

In early 2017, CNN reported that American Humane's representative for the movie A Dog's Purpose failed to properly monitor and protect a dog used in the film. American Humane placed an employee on leave after a video was published showing the dog in distress while performing a stunt for the movie. A third-party report later found that the video was "deliberately edited for the purpose of misleading the public and stoking public outrage."

Recent programs

Humane Heartland
In 2000, American Humane's Farm Animals Services program created the first farm animal welfare label to be overseen by the U.S. Department of Agriculture. The program began as "Free Farmed" under Adele Douglass, who left American Humane in 2003, to found Humane Farm Animal Care. American Humane's program is now called "Humane Heartland."

American Humane certifies farms after evaluating them on a five-point criteria.  The animals are expected to be free from hunger, discomfort, pain, and fear, and able to express normal behaviors.  Farms that meet this criteria receive an American Humane Certified label.

In the past four years, the number of American Humane Certified animals has jumped more than 1,000%.  Over 1 billion animals are now American Humane Certified. As of July 2012, it claimed to include 100 major producers, representing approximately 500 farms, and more than 135 million animals. The auditing is done by American Humane, with the USDA also auditing the certifications to ensure compliance. The label informs purchasers that American Humane has found that the animals were not subjected to unnecessary pain, distress, or fear while being raised. Part of what the program demands is the implementation of minimum space requirements per animal on a farm or in farming facilities. American Humane currently certifies approximately 90 percent of cage-free eggs sold in the U.S.

Controversy
In 2013, Foster Farms earned the American Humane Certified designation from American Humane for its handling of poultry. In June 2015, Mercy for Animals released a video of an undercover investigation of several Foster Farms poultry facilities certified as "humane" by American Humane.  The footage included workers treating the chickens violently and using inhumane slaughter methods; this resulted in Mercy for Animals calling American Humane's certification program "a scam".

The American Humane Hero Dog Awards
Each year a series of dogs are awarded the Hero Dog Awards, given to dogs that have contributed substantially to human society. There are several categories in which dogs can be nominated, including the Military Dog category. The grand prize for the American Hero Dog was $10,000, which is given to a charity that reflects the contributions of the animal. In 2011 and 2012 the awards were broadcast on the Hallmark Channel. The first winner of the national award was a dog named Roselle, who led his blind owner down from the 78th floor of the World Trade Center during the September 11 attacks. There were more than 400,000 votes cast in the online poll that determined the winner. Unfortunately, Roselle died several months before the winner was announced. The award was given on November 11, 2011.

Child welfare services
American Humane has several initiatives to improve child welfare services.

Front Porch Project
American Humane launched the Front Porch Project in 1997 in order to prevent child abuse and neglect. American Humane works through 'sustainer' organizations in local communities in order to intervene on behalf of at-risk and abused children.

In addition to building a network of community trainers, the Front Porch Project also invests in evaluating the performance of their initiatives in each of the communities they operate in.

The Fatherhood Initiative
American Humane launched the Fatherhood Initiative in order to develop better methods of engaging non-resident fathers with children who are in the welfare system. The project researches the impact of non-resident fathers on their children, and examines how to foster or improve their relationship.

The Fatherhood Initiative also provides information to caseworkers on techniques to identify and locate non-resident fathers.

Governance and finances
American Humane's budget for 2013 was just over $13 million. Their total revenue was $13.4 million.

The organization closed its Denver, Colorado office in 2011 and moved its operations to Washington, D.C.

Eric Bruner, the board chair of the organization, resigned in January 2013 amidst revelations that American Humane paid $233,863 to his business partner, Gregory Dew, for unspecified consulting services. Dew was the highest paid American Humane "independent contractor" in the fiscal year that ended June 30, 2011, according to filings the charity submitted to the IRS.

Employees
In 2004, Marie Belew Wheatley became executive director of American Humane. In 2010, she left to become the executive director of the Colorado Ballet, and then left the Colorado Ballet in 2013.
Current American Humane President and CEO Robin Ganzert received $284,912 in compensation for 2013. Jack Hubbard serves as American Humane's Chief Operating Officer.

People

 James Brown
 John G. Shortall (1837-1908), president (1884-1885, 1892-1898)
 John L. Shortall
 Nora Trueblood Gause (1851-1955), recipient, "American Humane Award" (1952)
 Elbridge T. Gerry, III president (1888)
 Peter G. Gerry
 Francis H. Rowley, secretary (1892-1900)
 Albert Leffingwell, M.D., president (1904)
 William Olin Stillman, president (1904-1924)
 Frank L. Baldwin, vice president (1923)
 Robin Ganzert, president and CEO (2010–present)

See also
 Animals in film and television

References

Sources
 Coleman, Sydney. Humane Society Leaders in America (Albany: American Humane Association, 1924).

External links
 

Organizations established in 1877
Animal welfare organizations based in the United States
1877 establishments in the United States